Patrick Reynolds (1 March 1887 – 14 February 1932) was an Irish Cumann na nGaedheal politician.

A merchant and farmer, he was elected to Dáil Éireann as a Cumann na nGaedheal Teachta Dála (TD) at the September 1927 general election for the Leitrim–Sligo constituency. 

He was nominated as a candidate for the 1932 general election, but during the campaign he was shot and killed on 14 February 1932 by a former Royal Irish Constabulary (RIC) officer, Joseph Leddy. Garda Detective Patrick McGeehan who was trying to shield Reynolds was fatally wounded. The election in Leitrim–Sligo was then postponed, and when it was held his widow Mary Reynolds won a seat, serving in the Dáil for 25 years.

Leddy had helped the IRA during the Irish War of Independence and had received a pension on Reynolds' recommendation; the two were friends and drinking companions, but had recently fallen out over the small size of Leddy's pension, and Leddy had begun to support a rival politician. Leddy was tried in Dublin and received a one-year sentence for manslaughter, the jury citing provocation. Mary Reynolds received IR£1,000 in a civil lawsuit.

His son Patrick J. Reynolds, who took over and expanded the family business, was a long-serving member of Leitrim County Council, and also a Fine Gael TD and senator, serving as Cathaoirleach of the Seanad from 1983 to 1987. Pat Joe's son Gerry Reynolds was also a TD and senator.

See also
Families in the Oireachtas

References

1887 births
1932 deaths
Assassinated Irish politicians
Cumann na nGaedheal TDs
Irish farmers
Members of the 6th Dáil
People murdered in Ireland
Politicians from County Leitrim
Spouses of Irish politicians
1932 in Ireland
1932 murders in Europe
1930s murders in Ireland
1932 crimes in Ireland